The Winter House near Goodrich, North Dakota was built in 1900.  It built in vernacular Russian-German style by Daniel Winter.  It was listed on the National Register of Historic Places but was delisted in 2009.

Delisting usually means that a building was demolished or otherwise lost its historic integrity.

Built by immigrant Daniel Winter, it is significant as a surviving example of what is termed "puddled clay" construction, brought from Russia.

References

German-Russian culture in North Dakota
Houses on the National Register of Historic Places in North Dakota
Houses completed in 1900
Houses in Sheridan County, North Dakota
National Register of Historic Places in Sheridan County, North Dakota
Former National Register of Historic Places in North Dakota